The men's doubles tennis event of the 2019 Pan American Games was held from July 29 through August 3 at the Club Lawn Tennis de La Exposcicion in Lima, Peru.

Gonzalo Escobar and Roberto Quiroz of Ecuador won the gold medal, defeating Guido Andreozzi and Facundo Bagnis of Argentina in the final, 6–4, 3–6, [10–8].

Sergio Galdós and Juan Pablo Varillas of Peru won the bronze medal, defeating Boris Arias and Federico Zeballos of Bolivia in the bronze-medal match, 6–3, 3–6, [12–10].

Seeds

Draw

Finals

Top half

Bottom half

References
 Draw

Men's Doubles